Thappad is a 2020 Indian Hindi-language drama film directed by Anubhav Sinha, starring Taapsee Pannu. The film released theatrically on 28 February 2020.This film got positive reviews from both critical and audience.
 
At the 66th Filmfare Awards, Thappad received 15 nominations, including Best Director (Sinha), Best Supporting Actor (Mishra) and Best Supporting Actress (Azmi), and won 7 awards, including Best Film and Best Actress (Pannu), thus becoming the most-awarded film at the ceremony. The film was an commercially successful film and was an hit at box office.

Plot
Amrita Sandhu and Vikram Sabharwal are happily married. Amrita is a sparkling woman and a homemaker, who is shown to spend her days looking after Vikram and the house. They throw a party at home to celebrate Vikram's promotion that would relocate them to London. During the party, Vikram is informed that his promotion contract has been compromised for his inexperienced junior, who is a relative of his boss. Angered, he gets into an argument with his superior, Rajhans, whom he accuses of two-timing him. When Amrita tries to break up the argument, Vikram slaps her in front of everyone. The incident leaves her shaken; she starts to realize all the little unfair things that she had previously ignored and admits to herself that Vikram slapping her isn't what a husband who respects her would do. Moreover, Vikram refuses to take accountability for his actions, stating that he was upset, she got in the way, and that such things happen sometimes and it's normal.

Unable to "forget it and move on", as everyone advises her to, Amrita leaves for her parents’ home, leading to an argument between her and Vikram. He sends a legal document to force her to return home. When she refuses, her lawyer Netra Jaisingh, a renowned advocate, explains to her that her options are to either reconcile, file for legal separation, or get a divorce. She files for divorce, shocking her family and relatives. Amrita doesn't make any claims for alimony nor does she file a domestic violence charge; her stand is simply that Vikram has no right to hit her, not even once. She explains that she only asks for respect and happiness and the slap opened her eyes to the fact that she wasn't getting either. 

Things get complicated when Amrita discovers she is pregnant. Vikram and his lawyer Pramod Gujral play dirty when he finds out that about the pregnancy. They make false claims against her mental stability and honesty and file frivolous charges against Amrita to try and intimidate her and get sole custody of the unborn child. Hurt, Amrita decides to file for the domestic violence charge against Vikram unless he agrees to a mutual consent divorce and joint custody of their expected child.

Vikram and Gujral agree to the terms presented by Amrita and Netra and settle for a mutual consent divorce. Meanwhile, Vikram's boss, Ahuja, informs him that he is getting the promotion. While congratulating him personally, Rajhans tells Vikram that what happened on the night of the party was Vikram's fault. 

Amrita speaks to her mother-in-law Sulakshana in the presence of both their families, explaining that she was hurt that on the night that he slapped her, nobody in the family came to see her or asked even once if she was okay; they did not hold Vikram accountable, tell him he was wrong, or advise him to apologise, while at the same time simply telling her to endure it to keep the peace. She mentions that she had lost her sense of identity over the years while trying hard to keep Vikram and everyone else happy. Sulakshana apologises for the family's mistake, acknowledging their ingrained misogyny, and tells Amrita that she is doing the right thing by taking a stand for herself. 

Throughout the film, Amrita's journey is intertwined with that of Netra and the Sabharwals' maid, Sunita, who realise that they have been wronged by their husbands as well. Her actions help them find the strength to confront those problems and find solutions. The film also shows snippets of the life of Amrita's neighbour, Shivani Fonseca, who is a single working mother to a young girl and Amrita's dance student Sania.

When Amrita and Vikram meet at Family Court to finalise their divorce, Vikram realises he is wrong and apologises to her properly and tells her that he rejected the promotion and quit his job. He wonders out loud why he ever thought that he had a right to hit her or disrespect her in any way. He explains that he will start again from scratch and will try to be someone who deserves her. They complete the formalities and part ways with a sense of renewed hope.

Cast

 Taapsee Pannu as Amrita Sabharwal (née Sandhu) 
 Pavail Gulati as Vikram Sabharwal, Amrita's husband 
Dia Mirza as Shivani Fonseca, Amrita's friend; Vikram's neighbour 
Maya Sarao as Advocate Netra Jaisingh
Geetika Vidya Ohlyan as Sunita
Kumud Mishra as Sachin Sandhu, Amrita's father
Ratna Pathak Shah as Sandhya Sandhu, Amrita's mother
Tanvi Azmi as Sulakshana Sabharwal, Vikram's mother
Ram Kapoor as Advocate Pramod Gujral
 Naila Grewal as Swati Sandhu, Karan's fiancé
Ankur Rathee as Karan Sandhu, Amrita's brother 
Sushil Dahiya as Romesh Sabharwal, Vikram's father 
Nidhi Uttam as Kavita Sabharwal, Vikram's sister-in-law 
Siddhant Karnick as Viraj Sabharwal, Vikram's brother 
Manav Kaul as Rohit Jaisingh, Netra's husband
Gracy Goswami as Sania Fonseca
 Rohan Khurana as Priyan
 Shantanu Ghatak as Subodh
Harssh A. Singh as Rajhans Jetley
 Purnendu Bhattacharya as Thapar
Anil Rastogi as Justice Jaisingh, Netra's father-in-law
Mritunjoy Dev Nath as actor

Production
Principal photography began on 6 September 2019 and ended on 16 October. The film was shot in various places of Uttar Pradesh mainly at Shalimar Paradise, Barabanki and other locations in Lucknow.

Promotion and release
The film was initially set for release on 6 March 2020, but was moved a week earlier to 28 February 2020 in order to avoid clashing with Baaghi 3, a big commercial release.

On 11 February, a second trailer was released which showed Pannu breaking the fourth wall and asking viewers to report the video so that it gets blocked on YouTube.

Reception

Critical response
Praise about the film was focused on its social message, screenplay, direction and performances, but was criticized for its pacing. On review aggregator website Rotten Tomatoes, the film holds an approval rating of  based on  reviews.

Box office
Thappad earned 2.76 crore net at the domestic box office on the first day. On the second day, the film collected ₹5.05 crore. On the third day, the film collected ₹5.76 crore taking total opening weekend collection to ₹13.57 crore.

, with a gross of 35.13 crore in India and 8.64 crore overseas, the film has a worldwide gross collection of 43.77 crore.

Accolades

Soundtrack

 
The film's songs are composed by Anurag Saikia and lyrics written by Shakeel Azmi and Sanah Moidutty. Additional verses of the song 'Ek Tukda Dhoop' appear only in the movie and these are not officially released in any of the digital platforms.

The song Hayo Rabba is the recreation of Pakistani folk singer Reshma's old song Hai O Rabba Nahion Lagda Dil Mera.

Home media
The film was made available to stream on OTT platform Amazon Prime Video on 1 May 2020.

Impact
Followіng the fіlm's release, Rajasthan Police shared a poster of the film with the helpline number to report domestic violence.

References

External links
 
 

2020s Hindi-language films
Hindi-language drama films
Films about women in India
2020 films
Films about domestic violence
Indian drama films
2020 drama films